The women's 100 metre freestyle was a swimming event held as part of the swimming at the 1924 Summer Olympics programme. It was the third appearance of the event, which was established in 1912. The competition was held on Saturday July 19, 1924, and on Sunday July 20, 1924.

Records
These were the standing world and Olympic records (in minutes) prior to the 1924 Summer Olympics.

In the first heat Mariechen Wehselau set a new world record with 1 minute 12.2 seconds.

Results

Heats

The fastest two in each heat and the fastest third-placed from across the heats advanced.

Heat 1

Heat 2

Heat 3

Heat 4

Semifinals

The fastest two in each semi-final and the faster of the two third-placed swimmer advanced to the final.

Semifinal 1

Semifinal 2

Final

References

External links
Olympic Report
 

Swimming at the 1924 Summer Olympics
1924 in women's swimming
Women's events at the 1924 Summer Olympics